The 2008 Asian Youth Boys Volleyball Championship was held in Sugathadasa Indoor Stadium, Colombo, Sri Lanka from 14 to 22 October 2008.

Pools composition
The teams are seeded based on their final ranking at the 2007 Asian Youth Boys Volleyball Championship.

* Withdrew

Preliminary round

Pool A

|}

|}

Pool B

|}

|}

Classification 9th–11th

Semifinals

|}

9th place

|}

Final round

Championship

Quarterfinals

|}

5th–8th semifinals

|}

Semifinals

|}

7th place

|}

5th place

|}

3rd place

|}

Final

|}

Final standing

Awards
MVP:  Farhad Salafzoun
Best Scorer:  Pouria Fayazi
Best Spiker:  Dai Qingyao
Best Blocker:  Saman Faezi
Best Server:  Song Jianwei
Best Setter:  Kosuke Tomonaga
Best Libero:  Taiki Tsuruda

References
 www.asianvolleyball.org

External links
FIVB

A
V
V
Asian Boys' U18 Volleyball Championship